Ken Haigh (born 1962) is a Canadian librarian and writer. He is most noted for his 2021 book On Foot to Canterbury, which was shortlisted for the 2021 Hilary Weston Writers' Trust Prize for Nonfiction.

Haigh has worked primarily as a librarian, most recently serving as CEO of the Collingwood Public Library in Collingwood, Ontario until early 2021. He published his first book Under the Holy Lake, a memoir of two years that he spent living in Bhutan in his youth, in 2008. On Foot to Canterbury, a memoir of his trip to England to partake in a traditional medieval pilgrimage from Winchester to Canterbury Cathedral, was published in 2021.

References

1962 births
Living people
21st-century Canadian male writers
21st-century Canadian non-fiction writers
Canadian male non-fiction writers
Canadian memoirists
Canadian Anglicans
Canadian librarians